In quantum physics, Fermi's golden rule is a formula that describes the transition rate (the probability of a transition per unit time) from one energy eigenstate of a quantum system to a group of energy eigenstates in a continuum, as a result of a weak perturbation. This transition rate is effectively independent of time (so long as the strength of the perturbation is independent of time) and is proportional to the strength of the coupling between the initial and final states of the system (described by the square of the matrix element of the perturbation) as well as the density of states. It is also applicable when the final state is discrete, i.e. it is not part of a continuum, if there is some decoherence in the process, like relaxation or collision of the atoms, or like noise in the perturbation, in which case the density of states is replaced by the reciprocal of the decoherence bandwidth.

General
Although the rule is named after Enrico Fermi, most of the work leading to it is due to Paul Dirac, who twenty years earlier had formulated a virtually identical equation, including the three components of a constant, the matrix element of the perturbation and an energy difference. It was given this name because, on account of its importance, Fermi called it "golden rule No. 2".

Most uses of the term Fermi's golden rule are referring to "golden rule No. 2", but Fermi's "golden rule No. 1" is of a similar form and considers the probability of indirect transitions per unit time.

The rate and its derivation
Fermi's golden rule describes a system that begins in an eigenstate  of an unperturbed Hamiltonian  and considers the effect of a perturbing Hamiltonian  applied to the system. If  is time-independent, the system goes only into those states in the continuum that have the same energy as the initial state.

In both cases, the transition probability per unit of time from the initial state  to a set of final states  is essentially constant. It is given, to first-order approximation, by

This transition probability is also called "decay probability" and is related to the inverse of the mean lifetime.

The standard way to derive the equation is to start with time-dependent perturbation theory and to take the limit for absorption under the assumption that the time of the measurement is much larger than the time needed for the transition.

Only the magnitude of the matrix element  enters the Fermi's golden rule. The phase of this matrix element, however, contains separate information about the transition process.
It appears in expressions that complement the golden rule in the semiclassical Boltzmann equation approach to electron transport.

While the Golden rule is commonly stated and derived in the terms above, the final state (continuum) wave function is often rather vaguely described, and not normalized correctly (and the normalisation is used in the derivation). The problem is that in order to produce a continuum there can be no spatial confinement (which would necessarily discretise the spectrum), and therefore the continuum wave functions must have infinite extent, and in turn this means that the normalisation  is infinite, not unity. If the interactions depend on the energy of the continuum state, but not any other quantum numbers, it is usual to normalise continuum wave-functions with energy  labelled , by writing  where  is the Dirac delta function, and effectively a factor of the square-root of the density of states is included into .

where  refers to the continuum state with the same energy as the discrete state .  For example, correctly normalized continuum wave functions for the case of a free electron in the vicinity of a hydrogen atom are available in Bethe and Salpeter.

Applications

Semiconductors
The Fermi golden rule can be used for calculating the transition probability rate for an electron that is excited by a photon from the valence band to the conduction band in a direct band-gap semiconductor, and also for when the electron recombines with the hole and emits a photon.

For a charged particle in the valence band, the Hamiltonian is

where  is the potential of the crystal. The resulting Hamiltonian is

where  is the perturbation of the EM wave.

From here on we have transition probability based on time-dependent perturbation theory that

where  is the light polarization vector. From perturbation it is evident that the heart of the calculation lies in the matrix elements shown in the bracket.

where  is the number of unit cells with volume . Using these wavefunctions and with some more mathematics, and focusing on emission (photoluminescence) rather than absorption, we are led to the transition rate

where  is the transition dipole moment matrix element is qualitatively the expectation value  and in this situation takes the form

Finally, we want to know the total transition rate . Hence we need to sum over all initial and final states (i.e. an integral of the Brillouin zone in the k-space), and take into account spin degeneracy, which through some mathematics results in

where  is the joint valence-conduction density of states (i.e. the density of pair of states; one occupied valence state, one empty conduction state). In 3D, this is

but the joint DOS is different for 2D, 1D, and 0D.

Finally we note that in a general way we can express the Fermi golden rule for semiconductors as

Scanning tunneling microscopy

In a scanning tunneling microscope, the Fermi golden rule is used in deriving the tunneling current. It takes the form

where  is the tunneling matrix element.

Quantum optics
When considering energy level transitions between two discrete states, Fermi's golden rule is written as

This alternative expression relies on the fact that there is a continuum of final (photon) states, i.e. the range of allowed photon energies is continuous.

Drexhage experiment

Fermi's golden rule predicts that the probability that an excited state will decay depends on the density of states. This can be seen experimentally by measuring the decay rate of a dipole near a mirror: as the presence of the mirror creates regions of higher and lower density of states, the measured decay rate depends on the distance between the mirror and the dipole.

See also
 
 
 
 
 
 Sargent's rule

References

External links
More information on Fermi's golden rule
Derivation of Fermi’s Golden Rule
Time-dependent perturbation theory
Fermi's golden rule: its derivation and breakdown by an ideal model

Equations of physics
Perturbation theory
Mathematical physics